Baron Gridley, of Stockport in the County Palatine of Chester, is a title in the Peerage of the United Kingdom. It was created on 10 January 1955 for the Conservative politician Sir Arnold Gridley, who had earlier represented Stockport and Stockport South in the House of Commons.  the title is held by his grandson, the third Baron, who succeeded his father in 1996.

Richard, the present Lord Gridley, is married to Marie, Lady Gridley. They live in Waterlooville, Hampshire.

Barons Gridley (1955)
Arnold Babb Gridley, 1st Baron Gridley (1878–1965)
Arnold Hudson Gridley, 2nd Baron Gridley (1906–1996)
Richard David Arnold Gridley, 3rd Baron Gridley (born 1956)

The heir presumptive is the present holder's first cousin Peter Arnold Charles Gridley (born 1940).

Line of Succession

  Arnold Babb Gridley, 1st Baron Gridley (1878—1965)
  Arnold Hudson Gridley, 2nd Baron Gridley (1906—1996)
  Richard David Arnold Gridley, 3rd Baron Gridley (born 1956)
Hon. Carl Richard Gridley (b. 1981)
 Eric Howard Gridley (1911—1946)
 (1) Peter Arnold Charles Gridley (b. 1940)
 (2)Howard Eric Gridley (b. 1945)

Notes

References
Kidd, Charles, Williamson, David (editors). Debrett's Peerage and Baronetage (1990 edition). New York: St Martin's Press, 1990, 

Baronies in the Peerage of the United Kingdom
Noble titles created in 1955
Noble titles created for UK MPs